Presidente Médici International Airport, formerly , was the airport that served Rio Branco, Brazil until 1999, when Plácido de Castro International Airport was opened. On that very occasion the airport was closed.

History
Pres. Médici International Airport was the first airport of Rio Branco, Brazil. Because of its proximity to the urban center and a legal dispute concerning ownership of the land where it was located, the airport was closed on November 22, 1999, when Plácido de Castro International Airport was opened at a different location.

Today the former runway is now used as Amadeu Barbosa Avenue and at one of its end is located the main football stadium of Rio Branco, called Arena da Floresta. The former passenger terminal and control tower still exist, albeit abandoned.

The following airlines once served the airport: Cruzeiro do Sul, Varig, VASP

Accidents and incidents
September 28, 1971: a Cruzeiro do Sul Douglas DC-3 A-414A registration PP-CBV crashed after take-off from Sena Madureira bound to Rio Branco. The aircraft suffered an engine failure at climb-out. The pilot tried to return to the airport but because the turn was done at very low altitude, the right wing struck trees causing the aircraft to crash. All 32 passengers and crew died.

Access

References

External links

Defunct airports in Brazil
Airports disestablished in 1999
Rio Branco, Acre